Santillana del Mar is a historic town situated in Cantabria, Spain. Its many historic buildings attract thousands of holidaymakers every year.

There is an old saying that Santillana del Mar is The Town of Three Lies, since it is neither a Saint (Santo), nor flat (llana), nor is it by the sea (Mar) as implied by its name. However, the name actually derives from Santa Juliana (or Santa Illana) whose remains are kept in the Colegiata, a Romanesque church and former Benedictine monastery. The UNESCO World Heritage site Cave of Altamira is nearby.

Localities
The 3,983 inhabitants (INE, 2006) are distributed as follows:
 Arroyo, 43 pop.
 Camplengo, 201 pop.
 Herrán, 204 pop.
 Mijares, 124 pop.
 Queveda, 586 pop.
 Santillana del Mar (capital), 1.108 pop.
 Ubiarco, 246 pop.
 Vispieres, 337 hab.
 Viveda, 1.069 pop.
 Yuso, 65 pop.

Notable people
Santillana (born 1952), footballer

Gallery

In literature
The protagonist of the novel Gil Blas was born in Santillana.

In his philosophical novel La Nausée, Jean-Paul Sartre described Santillana as the prettiest village in Spain ("le plus joli village d'Espagne").

References

External links
 
 Santillana travel guide at HitchHikers Handbook

Municipalities in Cantabria